Spiros Papadopoulos (7 November 1931 – 6 March 2023) was a Greek psychologist and politician. A member of New Democracy, he served in the Hellenic Parliament from 1985 to 1993.

Papadopoulos died on 6 March 2023, at the age of 91.

References

1931 births
2023 deaths
Greek psychologists
New Democracy (Greece) politicians
Greek MPs 1985–1989
Greek MPs 1989 (June–November)
Greek MPs 1989–1990
Greek MPs 1990–1993
Aristotle University of Thessaloniki alumni
People from Drama, Greece